Martin & King was a manufacturing company based in Melbourne, Australia. The company specialised in motor vehicle bodies and railway locomotives and rolling stock.

History
The company was initially based in the Melbourne suburb of Armadale from at least 1948, later opening a plant for railway stock at Clayton in the 1950s. In 1959 a new plant was opened at Somerton, which was provided with its own railway siding. Clyde Engineering acquired a controlling interest in the company in 1954. The Somerton plant is today occupied by Downer Rail.

Products

Bodywork for Buick cars (late 1930s)
Body for the Reo Speed Tanker trucks (1937)
Assembly of Jowett Javelins (1952)
Assembly of Volkswagen Beetles (1954)
Ford 103E utility (1955)
Melbourne's Harris suburban trains ('T' car bodies) (1950s)
Victorian Railways 102hp Walker railmotors (1948)
Victorian Railways 153hp Walker railmotors (1948)
Victorian Railways 280hp Walker railmotors (1950)
Melbourne's Hitachi suburban trains (fitting out of 'M' and 'D' cars) (1970s)
V/Line N class diesel locomotives (1985)
V/Line P class diesel locomotive rebuilds (from flat top T classes) (1980s)

References

Engineering companies of Australia
Defunct locomotive manufacturers of Australia
Defunct rolling stock manufacturers of Australia